The O. J. Daniels House is a historic house located  south of Jerome, Idaho. The lava rock house was constructed circa 1928 for farmer O. J. Daniels. While the home's craftsmanship resembles works by stonemason Marland Cox, its builder has not been determined. The home's vernacular design features symmetrical windows topped by flat rock arches, a stone lintel above the front door, and a gable roof.

The house was added to the National Register of Historic Places on September 8, 1983.

References

Houses on the National Register of Historic Places in Idaho
Houses completed in 1929
Houses in Jerome County, Idaho
National Register of Historic Places in Jerome County, Idaho